Curly Hammond (1879–1963) was a rugby union international who represented England from 1905 to 1908. He also captained his country.

Early life
Curly Hammond was born on 3 October 1879 in Pontefract and educated at Bedford School.

Rugby union career
Hammond made his international debut on 18 March 1905 at Athletic Ground, Richmond in the England vs Scotland match.
Of the 8 matches he played for his national side he was on the winning side on 3 occasions.
He played his final match for England on 8 February 1908 at Athletic Ground, Richmond in the England vs Ireland match.

References

1879 births
1963 deaths
English rugby union players
England international rugby union players
Rugby union forwards
People educated at Bedford School
Middlesex County RFU players
Rugby union players from Pontefract